Thomas A. Sangma (born July 27, 1961 in Tura, Meghalaya) is an Indian politician from Meghalaya and member of the National People's Party. He was elected to Upper House of India Parliament the Rajya Sabha for the term of 2008-2014 from Nationalist Congress Party.

References

Living people
1961 births
Rajya Sabha members from Meghalaya
People from West Garo Hills district
National People's Party (India) politicians
Nationalist Congress Party politicians from Meghalaya
21st-century Indian politicians
Garo people